Democratic Force nicknamed “El Naranjazo” (the Big Orange or the Orange Hit because the color of its flag) was a political party in Costa Rica.

The party was founded in 1992 by Gerardo Trejos and other left-wing Costa Rican leaders taking the structure of the Progress Party that nominated poet Isaac Felipe Azofeifa for the 1990 general election. For around a decade was Costa Rica's main alternative force and third party in a very rigid two-party system dominated by the major parties PLN and PUSC.

In the 1994 elections the party won 2 seats, whilst its candidates in the presidential election; TV personality and folklorist Miguel Zúñiga Díaz a.k.a. Miguel Salguero, finished third with 1.9% of the vote. In the 1998 elections it gained 3 seat, whilst its candidate (this time historian Vladimir De la Cruz De Lemos) again finished third in the presidential contest. The appearance of new progressive party PAC that manage to attract most of the anti-bipartisan vote with its charismatic leader Ottón Solís and very harsh internal conflicts gravely affected the party and despite receiving 2% of the parliamentary vote in 2002 it lost all three seats, whilst De la Cruz De Lemos finished seventh in the presidential election, receiving just 0.3% of the vote. The party disbanded in 2010, some of its members became members of other parties, like former San José councilor and latter deputy Alberto Salom and former deputy Rodrigo Gutiérrez joined PAC whilst others like former deputy José Merino del Río and his advisor José María Villalta joined the new left-wing party Broad Front.

References

Defunct political parties in Costa Rica
Political parties established in 1994
1994 establishments in Costa Rica